Cerje is a South Slavic toponym, referring to . It may refer to:

In Albania
 Cerje, Albania, village in the Pustec Municipality

In Croatia
 Cerje, Vrbovec, village in the Vrbovec municipality
 Cerje, Zagreb, village in the Zagreb metropolitan area
 Cerje Jesenjsko, village in the Jesenje municipality
 Cerje Letovanićko, village in the Lekenik municipality
 Cerje Nebojse, village in the Maruševec municipality
 Cerje Pokupsko, village in the Pokupsko municipality
 Cerje Samoborsko, village within the Samobor metropolitan area
 Cerje Tužno, village in the Ivanec municipality
 Cerje Vivodinsko, village in the Ozalj municipality
 Ličko Cerje, village near Lovinac

In Macedonia
 Cerje, Skopje, archeological site in the Republic of Macedonia

In Serbia
 Cerje, Bajina Bašta, village in the Bajina Bašta municipality
 Cerje, Kraljevo, village in the Kraljevo municipality
 Cerje (Niš), village in the Niš municipality